The Meilen-Trophy is a Group 2 flat horse race in Germany open to thoroughbreds aged three years or older. It is run at a variety of German racecourses over a distance of 1,600 metres (about 1 mile), and it is scheduled to take place in July of each year.

History
The event was established in 1991, and it was originally held at Hoppegarten. It was initially given Group 3 status, and was promoted to Group 2 level in 1994. For a period it was called the Berlin Brandenburg-Trophy.

The race's venue has rotated between several German courses since 2005. It has been contested at Cologne (2005–06, 2017), Hanover (2007–08, 2010, 2012, 2014-15), Düsseldorf (2009, 2011, 2016) and Krefeld (2013). During this period it has been run under several different titles.

Records

Winners until 2004

Winners since 2005

See also
 List of German flat horse races
 Recurring sporting events established in 1991 – this race is included under its former title, Berlin Brandenburg-Trophy.

References
 Racing Post:
 

Open mile category horse races
Horse races in Germany
Recurring sporting events established in 1991
1991 establishments in Germany